The Dallas Express was a weekly newspaper published in Dallas, Texas from 1892 to 1970.  It covered news of blacks in Dallas and a large portion of Texas.  It called itself "The South's Oldest and Largest Negro Newspaper." It was a member of the Associated Negro Press.

The Express publicized lynchings and incidents of violence against blacks that were not always reported in other newspapers, attacked racial segregation and voting restrictions, and in the 1930s urged establishment of "Negro day" and construction of the Hall of Negro Life at the State Fair of Texas, held in Dallas.  Even while under white ownership in the 1930s, the Express was an ardent supporter of and advocate for the black community.  It became more vocal after its 1938 acquisition by black leaders and campaigned for federally funded public housing, improved quality of black education in public schools, elimination of pay discrimination between black and white teachers, and the hiring of black police officers in Dallas.  It published photographs of black slum conditions with its campaign promoting public housing, a somewhat shocking use of graphics for the times.

History
W. E. King founded the Express and operated it until his murder by Hattie C. Burleson in late August 1919. In 1930, experiencing financial difficulties, it was acquired by Southwestern Negro Press, which was controlled by Travis Campbell, a white man who had been the printer for the Express and who purchased the paper to keep it in business.  In February 1938 it was acquired by A. Maceo Smith, an insurance executive and secretary of the Negro Chamber of Commerce; Rev. Maynard Jackson, pastor of New Hope Baptist Church; Dr. E. E. Ward, a physician; Henry Strickland, president of Excelsior Life Insurance Co.; and C. F. Starkes, president of Peoples Undertaking.

The Dallas Express title has been reused by an unrelated online publication that was originally established by Brian Timpone's conservative media network Metric Media. In February 2021, this incarnation of the Dallas Express was acquired and relaunched by Republican Party donor Monty Bennett, and adopted an editorial position claiming to be non-partisan. Despite this, The Texas Observer reported that the publication has been used as a prominent platform by a network of Dallas-based astroturfing groups such as Protect Texas Kids (which has participated in protests against drag shows and "woke" education), and the pro-police groups Keep Dallas Safe and Dallas Justice Now.

See also
 History of the African Americans in Dallas-Fort Worth

References

Further reading
Cox, Patrick.  The First Texas News Barons.  Austin: University of Texas Press, 2005.  .
Payne, Darwin.  Big D: Triumphs and Troubles of an American Supercity in the 20th Century.  Dallas: Three Forks Press, 2000.  .
About W.E. King: The Crisis February 1917, Cleveland Advocate August 1919.

External links 
 
 
 
 

Defunct African-American newspapers
Defunct newspapers of the Dallas–Fort Worth metroplex
Defunct weekly newspapers
Weekly newspapers published in Texas
Publications established in 1892
Publications disestablished in 1970
1892 establishments in Texas
1970 disestablishments in Texas